Begonia beryllae is a species of flowering plant in the family Begoniaceae, native to the island of Borneo. The type specimen was from the slopes of Mount Kinabalu in Sabah at an elevation of approximately 1600 m (4800 feet) above sea level. It grows as an herb up to 3 m tall.

References

beryllae
Endemic flora of Borneo
Flora of Sabah
Plants described in 1915
Flora of Mount Kinabalu
Flora of the Borneo montane rain forests